Cuphodes diospyri is a moth of the family Gracillariidae. It is known from South Africa.

The larvae feed on Diospyros natalensis. They mine the leaves of their host plant. The mine has the form of a small, very irregular, semi-transparent blotch-mine in a cluster usually near the top of the leaf.

References

Endemic moths of South Africa
Cuphodes
Moths of Africa
Moths described in 1961